The 7th Empire Awards ceremony, presented by the British film magazine Empire, honored the best films of 2001 and took place on 5 February 2002 at The Dorchester Hotel in London, England. During the ceremony, Empire presented Empire Awards in eight categories as well as three honorary awards. The honorary Independent Spirit Award was first introduced this year. English comedian Phill Jupitus hosted the show for the first time.

The Lord of the Rings: The Fellowship of the Ring and Moulin Rouge! were tied for most awards won with three awards apiece. The Lord of the Rings: The Fellowship of the Ring won the award for Best Film, while Moulin Rouge! won the award for Best Director for Baz Luhrmann. Other winners included Bridget Jones's Diary who won the award for Best British Film and Enigma with one award apiece. Michael Mann received the Empire Inspiration Award, Christopher Lee received the Lifetime Achievement Award and Alejandro Amenábar received the Independent Spirit Award for The Others.

Winners and nominees
Winners are listed first and highlighted in boldface.

Multiple awards
The following two films received multiple awards:

Multiple nominations
The following 11 films received multiple nominations:

References

External links
 
 

Empire Award ceremonies
2001 film awards
2002 in British cinema
2002 in London
February 2002 events in the United Kingdom
2000s in the City of Westminster